Fed cattle refers to cattle leaving a cattle feedlot, after fattening on a concentrated ration, that are ready to be sold to a packing plant for slaughter. Beef cattle are typically sold to packers at about 1,100 pounds, which yields a carcass weight of about 660 pounds.

See also
 Feeder cattle
 Live cattle

References

United States Department of Agriculture